Jose Dalman, officially the Municipality of Jose Dalman (Subanen: Benwa Jose Dalman; Chavacano: Municipalidad de Jose Dalman), is a 5th class municipality in the province of Zamboanga del Norte, Philippines. According to the 2020 census, it has a population of 28,881 people.

History
Jose Dalman was formerly known as Ponot, and was originally part of the municipality of Manukan. It was established as a separate municipality by virtue of Batas Pambansa Blg. 15, approved on January 3, 1979. On April 8, 1983, through the effort of former Assemblyman Guardson Lood, Batas Pambansa Blg. 381 was enacted renaming Ponot to its current name after Jose Dalman, one of the former students of the national hero Jose Rizal during his exile in Dapitan.

Geography

Barangays
Jose Dalman is politically subdivided into 18 barangays.

Climate

Demographics

Economy

Notable personalities

 Rene Mark Cuarto - Professional Boxer

See also
List of renamed cities and municipalities in the Philippines

References

External links
 Jose Dalman Profile at PhilAtlas.com
 [ Philippine Standard Geographic Code]
Philippine Census Information

Municipalities of Zamboanga del Norte